L'Anneau de Vitesse is an outdoor speed skating venue located in Grenoble, France. It hosted the speed skating events for the 1968 Winter Olympics. This Speed Circuit is located in a park of 27 hectares, the Park Paul Mistral. The park also hosts the Palais des sports was the main Olympic site in the city in 1968.

References
1968 Winter Olympics official report. pp. 105–6. 

Venues of the 1968 Winter Olympics
Olympic speed skating venues
Speed skating venues in France
Sports venues in Grenoble